Amrat Cola is a brand of cola. It is manufactured by the Pakistan Mineral Water Bottling Plant.

History
Established in 1985, Pakistan Mineral Water Bottling Plant (Pvt.) Ltd initially established with the initiative of introducing Mineral Water drink to the Pakistani consumer. In 1989 the company for franchisee for Coke International, until April 1994 when the company entered into a joint venture in PepsiCo International, which they discontinued in 2003. ABI is a part of the Pakistan Mineral Water Bottling Plant facility, where Amrat Cola is also produced. in Karachi, Lahore, Multan and Peshawar. Besides cola, Amrat also produces orange and 7Up-like soda. Amrat Cola cans and is available in many different sizes. The company introduced 'Amrat' products into the market in 2003, in 2005 they established  franchises in the cities of Lahore, and Multan, and were producing 30,000 cases/day.
The company is currently looking to introduce franchises outside the province of Punjab and venture into cities such as Hyderabad, Karachi, and Sukkur. Their goal being to expand through franchises, as well as distribution.

Products
Other than 'Amrat Cola', the company had also launched a citrus soda 'Amrat Lime', and an orange soda drink 'Amrat Orange'.

See also
 Pakola

References

External links
 Amrat Cola website

Cola brands
Pakistani drinks
Pakistani brands
Drink companies of Pakistan